The School of Education at American University is accredited by the Council for the Accreditation of Educator Preparation (CAEP) and by the Office of the State Superintendent of Education (OSSE).  The school offers undergraduate, master's, and doctoral degrees, as well as a post-masters graduate certificate in "Anti-Racist Administration and School Leadership." The school also runs a Center For Postsecondary Readiness and Success which "concentrates its research, professional development opportunities, and knowledge dissemination on improving the postsecondary opportunities for students who are historically disenfranchised and underrepresented on college campuses", and an Institute for Innovation in Education, which "conducts educational and translational research and administers research-informed professional development initiatives to improve teaching and learning in Washington, DC and beyond." 

The School of Education is located on the 4th Floor of American University's Spring Valley Building, located at 4801 Massachusetts Avenue, NW, about one mile from the main campus.

History 
For many decades, the School of Education was part of American University's College of Arts and Sciences, and it became a separate and independent school on July 1, 2019. Cheryl Holcomb-McCoy, who had been the Vice Provost for Faculty Affairs at Johns Hopkins University (JHU), and a Professor of Counseling and Human Development at the JHU School of Education, was hired as the School of Education's first Dean.

Notable faculty 

 Cheryl Holcomb-McCoy - School of Education dean and consultant to President Barack Obama's Reach Higher Initiative.
 Vivian Vasquez - author of eleven books and numerous book chapters and articles as well as the National Council for Teacher Education's 2019 Outstanding Elementary Educator in the English Language Arts Award winner.
 Sarah Irvine Belson - executive director of the Institute for Innovation in Education and former Dean of the School of Education, Teaching & Health at American University from 2002-2015.
Corbin Campbell - Associate Dean of Academic Affairs and Associate Professor at the School of Education, whose research has been highlighted in NPR, The Wall Street Journal, and The New York Times.
 Alida Anderson - widely published academic researcher, author, and co-editor of The Journal of the Arts and Special Education, a publication of the Division of the Visual and Performing Arts of the Council for Exceptional Children.
Stephen Vassallo - author of Critical Educational Psychology (2017) and Neoliberal Selfhood (2020).

References

External links 
American University School of Education Video Channel

American University
Educational institutions established in 2019
2019 establishments in Washington, D.C.